Jake William Gardiner (born July 4, 1990) is an American professional ice hockey defenseman who is currently playing for the Carolina Hurricanes of the National Hockey League (NHL). He has also played for the Toronto Maple Leafs. He was drafted 17th overall by the Anaheim Ducks in the 2008 NHL Entry Draft.

Early life
Gardiner was born in Minnesota to parents Jill and John Gardiner. His father ran a printing business and coached Jake's ice hockey teams.

Playing career

Early career

Gardiner played ice hockey at Minnetonka High School. Prior to his senior year at Minnetonka High School, Gardiner switched from forward to defense on the advice of Minnesota State University, Mankato coach Troy Jutting. In his senior year, Gardiner was named a top-10 finalist for the Mr. Hockey Award and was later drafted by the Anaheim Ducks in the first round, 17th overall, in the 2008 NHL Entry Draft. Despite his high draft place, he then attended the University of Wisconsin–Madison.

In his freshman season with the Badgers, Gardiner was named to the WCHA All-Rookie Team. As an alternate captain with the Badgers during the 2010–2011 season, Gardiner was named to the All-WCHA Second Team. While with the Badgers, on February 9, 2011, Anaheim traded Gardiner, along with Joffrey Lupul and a conditional fourth-round draft pick in 2013, to the Toronto Maple Leafs in exchange for defenseman François Beauchemin. Gardiner chose to forgo his senior season with the Badgers and instead signed a three-year entry level contract with the Toronto Maple Leafs.

Professional

Toronto Maple Leafs
Gardiner started the 2011–12 season with the Leafs, scoring his first career NHL goal on January 24, 2012, against Al Montoya of the New York Islanders. After his rookie campaign where he led rookie defensemen in scoring, Gardiner was named to the NHL All-Rookie Team.

Gardiner started his second season with the Toronto Marlies, due to the NHL Lockout. He posted 31 points in 43 games in the AHL, and then, once the NHL started up, he had 4 assists in 12 games. While playing with the Marlies, Gardiner suffered a concussion on December 8 and was out of the lineup for a month to recover. On May 6, 2013, Gardiner became the first Toronto Maple Leaf to score a home Stanley Cup playoff goal since Mats Sundin scored in a 3–2 loss to the Philadelphia Flyers on May 4, 2004, a span of nine years and two days. He finished the playoffs with points in 6 games.

Gardiner scored a career high 10 goals and 31 points in the 2013–2014 season, trailing only Cody Franson in points among Leafs' defenders.

On July 29, 2014, the Leafs signed Gardiner to a five-year, $20.25 million contract extension. The Leafs struggled that season, and Gardiner managed only 4 goals and 24 points in 79 games, fourth among Leafs' defenders.

For the 2015–16 season, the Leafs hired a new head coach, Mike Babcock, and cleared out Dion Phaneuf by the trade deadline. Gardiner had 7 goals and 31 points, second to Morgan Rielly among Leafs' defenders, taking a step forward under a new coach, even though the team lost the scoring presence of Phil Kessel.

In 2016–17, the Leafs became a winning team once again, an especially high scoring one with the addition of scoring phenoms Auston Matthews, William Nylander, and Mitch Marner, among others. Gardiner posted a career high of 43 points, and was a +24, leading all Leafs' defenders in both categories.

During the 2017–18 season, Gardiner recorded his 50th point of the season on April 2, 2018, in a game against the Buffalo Sabres. With his 50th point, and fellow defenceman Morgan Rielly already having 51 points, they became the first two Leafs defensemen with at least 50 points in a season since Tomáš Kaberle and Bryan McCabe did it in 2006–07. Both Gardiner and Rielly ended the regular season with a career high 52 points to help the Leafs to their second consecutive playoff showing, in which they would lose to the Boston Bruins in seven games in the first round.

The following season, Gardiner played in his 500th career NHL game on October 27, 2018, against the Winnipeg Jets. In the game, he scored the tying goal in the third period to help the Leafs defeat the Jets 3–2.

Carolina Hurricanes
On September 6, 2019, Gardiner signed a four-year, $16.2 million contract with the Carolina Hurricanes.

Prior to entering his third season with the Hurricanes on September 7, 2021, it was announced that Gardiner was to undergo hip and back surgeries, which ruled him out for the entirety of the  season.

International play

After the Toronto Maple Leafs failed to make a playoff run in the 2013–14 season, Gardiner joined teammates Nazem Kadri, James Reimer and Morgan Rielly to compete in the 2014 IIHF World Championship. He joined Team USA under coach Peter Laviolette, where the nation lost in the quarter-finals. The following year, Gardiner was again named to Team USA for the 2015 IIHF World Championship, where they placed third.

Personal life
On July 9, 2017, Gardiner married his long-time girlfriend Lucy, a fitness instructor, businesswoman, and social media influencer. In September 2018, Lucy gave birth to their first child, a son.

Gardiner's younger brother Max was selected by the St. Louis Blues in the third round, 74th overall, of the 2010 NHL Entry Draft. He also has a younger sister, Paige, who runs a jewelry business.

Career statistics

Regular season and playoffs

International

Awards and honors

References

External links

 

1990 births
Living people
American men's ice hockey defensemen
Anaheim Ducks draft picks
Carolina Hurricanes players
Ice hockey players from Minnesota
National Hockey League first-round draft picks
People from Minnetonka, Minnesota
Toronto Maple Leafs players
Toronto Marlies players
Wisconsin Badgers men's ice hockey players
AHCA Division I men's ice hockey All-Americans